Kent Roberts Greenfield (July 20, 1893, Chestertown, Maryland - 1967) was an American historian. He was a professor of history at Johns Hopkins University and chief architect of the official U.S. Army history of World War II. He is the author of 63 works in 277 publications in 4 languages.

References

Johns Hopkins University faculty
1893 births
1967 deaths
People from Chestertown, Maryland
American historians